Deidre Sharon Brown (born 1970) is a New Zealand art historian and architectural lecturer. Brown currently teaches at the University of Auckland and is the head of the School of Architecture and Planning. Additionally, she is a governor of the Arts Foundation of New Zealand, a member of the Māori Trademarks Advisory Committee of the Intellectual Property Office of New Zealand, and a member of the Humanities Panel of the Marsden Fund. In 2021 Brown was made a Fellow of the Royal Society Te Apārangi.

Early life 
Brown grew up in New Lynn, New Zealand, and is of Māori, Pākehā and English descent, of Ngāpuhi, Ngāti Kahu.

Career 
Brown attended the University of Auckland for both her undergraduate and graduate degrees. In 1997, she completed her PhD at the University of Auckland in New Zealand. Her 1997 thesis was titled Mōrehu Architecture which focused on Māori architecture between the years 1850 and 1950. After completing her education, Brown began to focus on teaching her specialty of Māori art history and architecture at universities.

Following her PhD in 1998, Brown began her academic career at the University of Canterbury School of Fine Arts, where she was a lecturer in the Art History department teaching Māori Art History. In 2003, Brown returned to the University of Auckland where she taught design and history in the School of Architecture and Planning. She is now a professor at the School of Architecture and Planning, with research interests in Māori architecture and art, the relationship of art and curatorship to architecture, and intersections between culture and technology. She has published a number of books about art and architecture that focuses on her interests, specifically Māori art. Brown has also curated a number of exhibitions in galleries throughout New Zealand. Over the years, Brown has received a number of awards for her impactful work. Brown has worked at the University of Auckland for over a decade and was named as the next head of the School of Architecture and Planning beginning in January 2019. She is the first indigenous female to head an architecture school.

Māori: academic focus 
Brown's main academic focus is the history of Māori art and architecture. Her focus on this culture within her studies began because of her personal connection as a descendant of the Māori people. Many of Brown's work discuss the culture of the Māori tribes, honing in on the art and architecture. 

The Māori are indigenous Polynesian people of New Zealand. They arrived in New Zealand between 1250 and 1300. The culture developed uniquely because of the people's isolation. They even developed their own language. Brown's work about Māori art and architecture reveals historical information about the distinct culture. Through much of her research new findings have developed about the isolated, indigenous culture.

Books 
Brown has contributed and edited a variety of books connected to her interests of study. She is the co-author of A New Zealand Book of Beasts: Animals in our History, Culture and Everyday Life with Annie Potts and Philip Armstrong in which her chapters examine the significance of animals in Māori and Pākehā art. Brown also wrote a book titled Māori Architecture that explores the different Māori-designed structures and space and their evolution over time. Brown continues to share her studies and interests of art and architecture with the world through research and literature.

Books Brown wrote or edited:

Brown, D. S., A. Potts and P. Armstrong, A New Zealand Book of Beasts: Animals in Our Culture, History and Everyday Life, Auckland University Press, Auckland.
2012 Brunt, P, S. Mallon, N. Thomas, D. S. Brown, S. Kuechler, L. Bolton and D. Skinner, Art in Oceania: A new history, Thames and Hudson & Yale University Press, London & New Haven.
2012 Brown, D. S. editor, Indigenising Knowledges for Current and Future Generations, Nga Pae o te Maramatanga and Te Whare Kura, Auckland.
2009 Brown, D.S., Maori Architecture, Raupo (Penguin) Publishing, Auckland, 187p.
2007 Brown, D.S. and N. Ellis, editors, Te Puna: Maori art from Te Tai Tokerau Northland, Reed Publishing, Auckland, 160p.
2005 Brown, D. S., Introducing Maori Art, Reed Publishing, Auckland, 76p. Reprinted by Raupo (Penguin) Publishing.
2005 Brown, D.S. Maori Arts of the Gods, Reed Publishing, Auckland, 95p. Reprinted by Raupo (Penguin) Publishing.
2003 Brown, D.S. Tai Tokerau Whakairo Rakau: Northland Maori Wood Carving, Auckland, Reed Publishing, 248p.

Awards 
Brown has been widely recognised for her impactful and significant contributions to the art history world. In 2004 Brown's book Tai Tokerau Whakairo Rākau: Northland Māori Wood Carving won the NZSA E.H. McCormick Best First Book Award for Non-Fiction at the Montana New Zealand Book Awards. Art in Oceania: A new history received the 2013 Art Book Prize (Banister Fletcher Award) from the Authors’ Club. Māori architecture: from fale to wharenui and beyond won the Art, Architecture and Design category in the 2009 Ngā Kupu Ora Māori Book Awards and was a finalist in the Illustrated Non-Fiction Category at the 2010 New Zealand Post Book Awards. Brown's dedication and passion for her studies has been acknowledged by numerous awards. In 2021, Brown was made a Fellow of the Royal Society Te Apārangi.

Awards Brown has received include:

 Art Book Prize (2014) for Art in Oceania: A new history for the best art or architecture book published in English anywhere in the world in 2013
 New Zealand Association for Research in Education (NZARE) Group Award (with five other investigators) for the Success for All: Improving Maori and Pasifika Success in Degree Level Studies project, 2012
 Fellowship, International Central Networking Fund (ICNF), to establish collaborative postgraduate teaching linkages with the University of British Columbia and University of Queensland, 2011
 Finalist, New Zealand Post Book Awards (Illustrated Non-Fiction category) for Māori Architecture, 2010
 New Zealand Institute of Architects National Awards President's Award for contribution to the institute and the profession of architecture, 2010
 Excellence in Equal Opportunity Award, University of Auckland, for Success for All: Improving Maori and Pasifika Success in Degree Level Studies project (with other investigators from NICAI, Education, Medical and Health Sciences, and Career Services), 2010
 Nga Kupu Ora Māori Book Award (Art, Design and Architecture section) for Māori Architecture; finalist in Nga Kupu Ora Māori Book Award (Book of the Decade) for Tai Tokerau Whakairo Rakau: Northland Maori Wood Carving, 2009
 Excellence in Equal Opportunity Award, University of Auckland, for NICAI Tuākana Research Assistants Workshop (with Dr Te Oti Rakena from Music, and Mona O’Shea and Matthew Tarawa from the Student Learning Centre), 2008
 Tertiary Teaching Excellence Award, University of Auckland, for Collaboration in Teaching (with Drs Diane Brand and Rosangela Tenorio), 2007.
 Innovation Award (for developing a ground-breaking project involving the arts) for the curation of LightSCAPE and Whare, Art and Industry Trust, 2004
 Montana New Zealand National Book Award (E. H. McCormick Prize, Best First Book by an Author, Non-Fiction) for Tai Tokerau Whakairo Rakau: Northland Māori Wood Carving, 2004

References

Further reading 
 'Māori architecture – whare Māori' in Te Ara: The Encyclopedia of New Zealand, Deidre Brown 

1970 births
Living people
People from Auckland
Academic staff of the University of Auckland
New Zealand art historians
New Zealand women academics
Ngāpuhi people
Ngāti Kahu people
Academic staff of the University of Canterbury
University of Auckland alumni
New Zealand Māori academics
Women art historians
New Zealand Māori women academics
Fellows of the Royal Society of New Zealand
New Zealand women architects